Matheus Fernandes Siqueira (born 30 June 1998) is a Brazilian professional footballer who plays as a central midfielder for Red Bull Bragantino, on loan from Palmeiras.

Club career

Botafogo 
Born in Itaboraí, Rio de Janeiro, Fernandes represented Botafogo as a youth. He was called up to the 2016 pre-season with the main squad, but was only promoted to the first team by manager Jair Ventura; late in the year, he renewed his contract until the end of 2019.

Fernandes made his senior debut on 28 January 2017, starting in a 1–1 Campeonato Carioca home draw against Nova Iguaçu. Four days later he made his Copa Libertadores debut, replacing Camilo in a 2–1 home win against Colo-Colo.

Fernandes was a regular starter for Bota during the 2018 campaign, appearing in 32 league matches (40 overall) and winning the year's Campeonato Carioca. He scored his first professional goal on 10 May of that year, netting the opener in a 1–1 Copa Sudamericana home draw against Audax Italiano (3–2 aggregate win).

Palmeiras
On 19 December 2018, Fernandes signed a five-year contract with Palmeiras, for a rumoured fee of R$ 15 million. A backup to regular starters Felipe Melo and Bruno Henrique, he was not registered for the year's Campeonato Paulista, and only made his debut for the club on 1 May, replacing Moisés in a 1–1 away draw against CSA.

Fernandes started to feature more regularly after Moisés' departure to Shandong Luneng, and scored his first goal on 1 December 2019, but in a 1–3 home loss against Flamengo.

Valladolid (loan)
On 31 January 2020, just hours after signing for Barcelona, Fernandes joined fellow La Liga side Real Valladolid on loan from Palmeiras. He only made his debut abroad on 20 June, starting in a 0–1 loss at Atlético Madrid.

Barcelona
On 31 January 2020, Barcelona announced that they had reached agreement with Palmeiras for the transfer of Fernandes, who would join the Catalan club ahead of the 2020–21 season at the end of September, after completing his loan spell with Real Valladolid. Barça paid a fee of €7 million plus €3 million on add-ons, and the player agreed to a five-year contract with the club. On 24 November, he made his first and only appearance for Barcelona's first team and also in the UEFA Champions League when he replaced Pedri for the final 17 minutes during a 4–0 away victory against Dynamo Kyiv in a Champions League group stage match.

On 17 April 2021, Matheus won his first and only trophy with Barcelona after his side defeated Athletic Bilbao 4–0 in the Copa del Rey final. Although he didn't feature for a single minute in the competition, he was considered as a winner as he was named in the matchday squads in two of the matches.

On 29 June 2021, his contract was terminated by Barcelona.

Return to Palmeiras
On 9 July 2021, Palmeiras signed Matheus for four and half seasons, till 31 December 2025, after his contract with Barcelona was terminated.

International career
Fernandes represented Brazil at under-17 and under-20 levels.

Career statistics

Honours

Club
Botafogo
 Campeonato Carioca: 2018

Barcelona
 Copa del Rey: 2020–21

Palmeiras
Copa Libertadores: 2021

References

External links

1998 births
Living people
Sportspeople from Rio de Janeiro (state)
Brazilian footballers
Association football midfielders
Campeonato Brasileiro Série A players
Botafogo de Futebol e Regatas players
Sociedade Esportiva Palmeiras players
Club Athletico Paranaense players
Red Bull Bragantino players
La Liga players
Real Valladolid players
FC Barcelona players
Brazil youth international footballers
Brazil under-20 international footballers
People from Itaboraí